Francisco dos Santos (8 March 1904 – ??) was a Portuguese footballer who played as a forward.

External links 
 
 

1904 births
Portuguese footballers
Association football forwards
Vitória F.C. players
Portugal international footballers
Year of death missing